Tzora is a kibbutz in central Israel. Located about 20 km from Jerusalem, near the city of Beit Shemesh, it falls under the jurisdiction of Mateh Yehuda Regional Council.

Etymology
The kibbutz is named for the biblical village of Tzora, which may have been a Canaanite town. The name was taken from the Biblical Book of Judges (13:25): "And the spirit of the Lord began to move him (Samson) at times in the camp of Dan between Zorah and Eshtaol."

The kibbutz's name is also similar to, and is related to that of the nearby and depopulated Palestinian village of Sar'a.

History

Biblical era
Tzora is located about 2 km south-west of Tel Tzora, which is where the Palestinian village of Sar'a stood until it was depopulated during the 1948 war.  Tel Tzora is the likely location of the biblical village of Zorah.

Second Temple era
A ritual bath dating back to the Second Temple Period was discovered near Tzora kibbutz during an archaeological excavation conducted by the Israel Antiquities Authority in 2011.

Modern era
The kibbutz was founded in December 1948 by former Palmach members.  It is located on the land of the depopulated Palestinian  village of Dayr Aban.

In the 1980s a ham radio club operated under the call 4Z4YJ.
In the early 2000s, Tzora underwent a privatization of its communal living structure, with a community tax levied on income and the residual retained as income by members. In April 2008, the kibbutz was fully privatized.

Economy
One of the main branches of the kibbutz economy was Tzora Furniture Ltd., which began in 1957 as a metal factory. At first, the company produced bicycles, but in 1974 it began to manufacture office chairs, before moving on to a full range of office furniture.  However, the factory burned down in July 2007. 
 In 1993, Tzora opened the first kibbutz winery, Tzora Vineyards, which produces 80,000 bottles of wine a year, of which 15,000 are exported. Tzora is also home to the Teperberg Winery.
Tzora operates a dairy in partnership with Tzova and Netiv HaLamed-Heh. Tzora Active Systems produce advanced lightweight wheelchairs.

Notable people

 Samson
 Moshe Harif
 Yair Tzaban

Gallery

References

External links
Official website (Hebrew)
Wikipedia (Hebrew)

Ancient Jewish settlements of Judaea
Kibbutzim
Kibbutz Movement
Populated places established in 1948
Populated places in Jerusalem District
1948 establishments in Israel
Zorah